Aleksei Maksimovich Kaledin (24 October 1861 – 11 February 1918) was a Don Cossack Cavalry General who led the Don Cossack White movement in the opening stages of the Russian Civil War.

Early Years
Kaledin attended the Mikhaylovskoye Artillery School and the General Staff Academy.

World War I
Kaledin served as a cavalry commander at the beginning of the war, before taking over command of a cavalry corps, and rising to the rank of General of the Cavalry.  He was then assigned command of the 8th Army on the Southwest Front, and participated in the Brusilov offensive.

Kaledin spoke at the Moscow State Conference, stating "all Soviets and committees must be abolished, both in the army and in the rear." Following the Kornilov affair, Kaledin retreated back to Novocherkassk, and protection of the voisko, to avoid arrest by the Provisional Government.

When he was 55 years old, the Cossack krug had elected Kaledin as their ataman. According to Peter Kenez, Kaledin "...thus became the first democratically chosen leader of the Cosacks since 1723."

Civil War
According to Kenez, "On November 9, immediately after receiving news of the Petrograd revolution, and acting in the name of the voisko government, he invited the members of the Provisional Government to Novocherkassk to join him in organizing the anti-Bolshevik struggle."  On 15 November, Mikhail Alekseyev arrived and started organizing a new army. On 20 November, the voisko declared its independence.  On 5 December, Kaledin declared martial law when news came of a Red Guard detachment had been sent by the Soviet regime.   Between 9 and 15 December, with the aid of the Alekseev Organization, Kaledin was able to suppress Bolshevik resistance in Rostov-on-Don, and then open the third session of the krug.  On 19 December, Lavr Kornilov arrived, and by the end of the month, had reorganized the Alekseev Organization into the Volunteer Army. By January 1918, Vladimir Antonov-Ovseenko was threatening Rostov and Taganrog with a force led by Sivers.  On 8 February, Sivers had taken control of Taganrog, and Kornilov decided to retreat from the Don.

The ensuing loss of Rostov-on-the-Don and the Volunteer Army's retreat during their Ice March led Kaledin to believe that the whole situation had become hopeless. On 11 February, he resigned from his post and committed suicide by shooting himself.

Honours and awards

Order of St. Anna, 3rd class (1897)
Order of Saint Stanislaus, 2nd class (1902)
Order of St. George, 4th class for the battle on the river near the village of Hnyla Lypa, October 12, 1914.
Order of St. George, 3rd class for the Battle of Kalush, September 12, 1915.
Sword of St. George

References

A biography and other resources 
The Great Soviet Encyclopedia entry for Kaledin

External links
 
 

1861 births
1918 deaths
People from Serafimovichsky District
People from Don Host Oblast
Don Cossacks
Don Cossacks noble families
Imperial Russian Army generals
Atamans
Russian military personnel of World War I
People of the Russian Civil War
Russian Constituent Assembly members
White movement generals
Recipients of the Order of St. George of the Third Degree
Recipients of the Order of St. Anna, 3rd class
Recipients of the Gold Sword for Bravery
Russian military personnel who committed suicide
Suicides by firearm in the Soviet Union